The Khanchaly (Xançılı) is a river in Yakutia (Sakha Republic), Russia.

The river flows across the Gorny, Namsky and Kobyaysky districts of Yakutia.

Course  
The entire length of the course of the Khanchaly falls within the Central Yakutian Lowland. The river flows first northeastwards, then it bends northwards, flowing parallel to the Kenkeme all along its middle and lower course. The Khanchaly heads steadily in a northern direction within poorly drained flatland until its mouth in the Lena.

There are many small lakes in the Khanchaly basin, especially on the western side, to the east of the course of the Sitte.  The river freezes between the second half of October and mid May.

Tributaries

See also
List of rivers of Russia

References

External links 
Fishing & Tourism in Yakutia

Rivers of the Sakha Republic
Central Yakutian Lowland